Sir Wyndham Knatchbull-Wyndham, 6th Baronet (16 February 1737 – 26 September 1763) was a British baronet and Whig politician.

Born in Golden Square in Middlesex, he was the only son of Sir Wyndham Knatchbull-Wyndham, 5th Baronet and his wife Catharine, daughter of James Harris. In 1749, aged only twelve, Knatchbull-Wyndham succeeded his father as baronet. He was educated at Wadham College, Oxford until 1757 and began then his Grand Tour. After his return in 1760, he entered the British House of Commons, sitting as a Member of Parliament (MP) for Kent in the following three years. In Parliament he voted against the Treaty of Paris (1763). Knatchbull-Wyndham died, aged 26, unmarried and was succeeded in the baronetcy by his uncle Edward Knatchbull.

References

1737 births
1763 deaths
Alumni of Wadham College, Oxford
Baronets in the Baronetage of England
British MPs 1754–1761
British MPs 1761–1768
Members of the Parliament of Great Britain for English constituencies
Wyndham